This is a list of caves in Australia.

Show caves

New South Wales

 Abercrombie Caves
 Ashford Caves
 Bendethera Caves
Borenore Caves
 Bungonia Caves
 Careys Caves
 Cliefden Caves
 Jenolan Caves (List of caves within the Jenolan Caves karst)
 Timor caves. Murrurundi.hunter valley
 Tuglow Caves
 Wee Jasper 
 Wellington Caves
 Wombeyan Caves
 Fig Tree Cave
 Wollondilly Cave
 Junction Cave
 Kooringa Cave
 Mulwaree Cave
 Dennings Labyrinth
 Wyanbene Caves
 Yarrangobilly Caves

Queensland

 Capricorn Caves
 Chillagoe-Mungana Caves
 Donna Cave
 Trezkinn Cave
 Royal Arch Cave

South Australia

 Kangaroo Island
 Kelly Hill Caves
 Lower South-East
 Cave Gardens (Mount Gambier)
 Engelbrecht Cave
 Tantanoola Caves
 Upper South-East
 Naracoorte Caves
 Alexandra Cave
 Blanche Cave
 Victoria Fossil Cave
 Wet Cave

Tasmania

 Gunns Plains Cave, Gunns Plains
 Mole Creek
 King Solomons Cave
 Marakoopa Cave
 Newdegate Cave, Hastings Caves

Victoria

 Buchan
 Buchan Caves
 Fairy Cave
 Royal Cave
Cloggs Cave
 Murrindal
 Shades of Death Cave
New Guinea II cave
 Byaduk Caves, Byaduk 
 Glenelg River
 Princess Margaret Rose Cave
Mudgegonga rock shelter  
Tarragal Caves

Western Australia

 South West
 Jewel Cave
 Lake Cave
 Mammoth Cave
 Moondyne Cave
 Ngilgi Cave (formerly Yallingup Cave)
 Yanchep
 Cabaret Cave
 Crystal Cave
 Yonderup Cave

Northern Territory
 Cutta Cutta Caves, Katherine

Wild caves

New South Wales

 The Big Hole and Marble Arch
 Blue Water Holes
 Bungonia Caves
 Careys Cave
 Cave Island
 Cliefden Caves
 Colong Caves
 Cotter Caves
 Jenolan Caves
 Timor Caves
 Yarangobilly
 St Michaels Cave
 Wee Jasper
 Wombeyan Caves

Queensland
 Camooweal Caves
 Five O’Clock Cave
 Four Mile East Cave
 Great Nowranie Cave
 Little Nowranie Cave
 Niggle Cave
 Chillagoe-Mungana Caves
 The Archways
 Pompeii Cave
 Bauhinia Cave
 Undara
 Undara Lava Tubes
 Mount Etna Caves National Park

South Australia
 Flinders Ranges
 Mairs Cave
 Mount Sims Cave
 Narrina Lake Cave
 Wooltana Cave
 Lower South-East
Fossil Cave
 Sheathers Cave
 Snake Hill Cave
 Murray River Area
 Punyleroo Cave
 River Road Cave
 Upper South-East
 Appledore Cave
 Beekeepers Cave
 Brownsnake Cave
 Cave Park Cave
 Echidna Cave
 Fox Cave
 Little Victoria Cave
 S102 Cave
 VDC Cave
 Yorke Peninsula
 Corra-Lynn Cave
 Town Well Cave
 Windmill Cave
 South-West
 Koonalda Cave
 Koongine Cave
 Murrawijinie Cave

Tasmania
 Exit Cave Ida Bay
 Growling Swallet, Junee Florentine Valley, Mount Field
 Honeycomb Caves, Caveside
 Mole Creek Caves
 Khubla Khan
 Mystery Creek Cave, Ida Bay
 Wet Caves, Caveside

Victoria
 Wilsons Cave
 Britannia Creek
 Britannia Creek Caves
 Buchan
 Kavery's Cave
 Labertouche
 Labertouche Cave

Western Australia

 Kimberly
 Cave Springs Cave
 Mimbi
 Old Napier Downs Cave
 Tunnel Creek
 Wangahinnya Caves
 Mid West Gascoyne
 Arramall Cave
 Drovers Cave
 Gooseberry Cave
 Mystery Cave
 Old River Cave
 River Cave
 Stockyard Gully Caves
 Aiyennu Cave
 Beekeepers Hole (also known as Uniwa Cave)
 Stockyard Bridge
 Stockyard Cave
 Stockyard Tunnel
 Weelawadji Cave
 Nullarbor
 Abrakurrie Cave
 Balladonia Cave
 Cocklebiddy Cave
 Horseshoe Cave
 Kellys Cave
 Koonalda (in South Australia)
 Old Homestead Cave
 Pannakin Plain Cave
 Thampanna Cave
 Stegamite Cave
 Weebubbie Cave (in South Australia)
 Perth/Peel/Yanchep
 The Catacombs
 Concinna Cave
 Gibb Cave
 Gidgee Karupa (Spear Cave)
 Kings Park Caves (tunnelled and extended during WW2 for Catalina FBY base)
 Loch Overflow
 Mambibby Cave
 Mandurah Caves
 Minnies Grotto
 Rottnest Island Caves
 Surprise Cave
 Wanneroo Karst
 Yanchep Cave
 Pilbara / Cape Range
 Anomaly Cave
 Bell Cave
 Canyon Cave
 Owl Roost Cave
 South West
 Arumvale Pipe and Arumvale Cave
 Beenup Cave
 Blackboy Hollow
 Bride
 Calgardup
 Cowarumup Cave
 Deeondeeup Cave
 Devils Lair and Nannup Cave
 Dingo Cave
 Easter Cave
 Giant's
 Golgotha Cave
 Ketelack Cave
 Labyrinth Cave
 Lost Pearl Cave
 Meekadorabee Cave
 Mill Cave
 Milligans Cave
 Nannup
 Northcote Grotto
 Old Kudardup Cave
 Quinninup Lake Cave
 Snake Pit Cave
 Strongs Cave
 Tiger
 Wallcliffe Cave
 Witchcliffe Cave

Australian territories
 Christmas Island
 Lava Tubes

Northern Territory
 Bullita Cave

Underwater Caves

New South Wales 

 Jenolan Caves
 Barralong Cave
 Blue Lake Cave 
 Cerberus Junction
 Far Country Cave
 Imperial Cave
 Lethe Cave
 Mammoth Cave
 Pool of Cerberus Cave
 Pool of Reflections Cave
 Slug Lake Cave
 Spider Cave
 Styx River Spring Cave
 Wellington Caves
 Anticline (Water) Cave
 Cathedral Cave
 Limekiln (McCavity) Cave
 Wombeyan Caves
 Bullio Cave
 Glass Cave

Queensland 

 Camooweal Caves
 Great Nowranie Cave
 Hassles Cave
 Niggle Cave
 Spinifex Cave

South Australia 

 Flingers Range Karst
 Narrina Lake Cave
 Mount Gambier Karst region
 Allendale Sinkhole
 Alleyns (Death) Cave
 Bakers Cave
 Benara Sinkhole
 Bottlebrush sinkhole (Banksia Cave)
 Bullocks Hole Cave
 Daves Cave
 Devils Punchbowl Cave
 Earls Cave
 Ela Elap Cave
 Engelbrechts Cave
 Ewens Ponds Cave
 Fossil Cave
 Gouldens Hole Cave
 Hancocks Cave
 Hanns Cave
 Hells Hole
 Horse & Cart Sinkhole
 Iddlebiddy Cave
 Kilsbys Sinkhole
 Little Blue Lake Cave
 Maxs Hole Cave
 McKays Shaft Cave
 Mud Hole Cave
 Nettlebed Cave
 One Tree (Wurwurlooloo) Cave
 Piccaninnie Ponds Cave
 Quarry Cave
 Sheathers Cave
 Swim Through Cave
 Tank Cave
 Tantanoola Lake Cave
 Teatree Sinkhole
 Ten Eighty Cave
 The Pines Cave
 The Shaft Cave
 The Sisters Cave
 Three Sisters Cave
 Woolwash Cave

Tasmania 

 Mole Creek caves
 Khubla Khan (Underwater segment)
 Junee Florentine Caves
 Growling Swallet (Underwater segment)
 Junee Cave
 Lawrence Rivulet Rising Cave
 Tigers Eye Cave

Victoria 

 Murrindal Caves
 Dalleys Sinkhole
 Elk River Cave

Western Australia 

 Cape Range Karst
 6C-215 Cave
 Bundera Sinkhole
 Dozer Cave
 Gnamma Hole Cave
 Kimberly Karst
 Kija Blue Sinkhole
 KNI-52 Cave
 KNI-64 Cave
 Old Napier Downs Cave
 Waterfall Cave
 Nullabor Karst
 Burnabbie Cave
 Cocklebiddy Cave
 Koonalda Cave
 Mullamullang Cave
 Murra-El-Elevyn Cave
 Nurina Cave
 Olwolgin Cave
 Pannikin Plains Cave
 Slot Cave
 Tommy Grahams Cave
 Warbla Cave
 Weebubbie Cave
 Winbirra Cave
 South Hill River Karst
 Toombstones (Wolka Wolka Well) Cave

Australian Territories 

 Christmas Island
 Thundercliff Cave
 West White Beach Cave

Northern Territory 

 Kathrine Karst
 Kathrine Hot Springs

See also 
 List of caves (Global)
 Speleology 
 Cave diving
 Caving (Also known as Spelunking or Potholing)
 Karst
 Cave diving regions of the world

External links

 The Australian Karst Index
 The Australian Speleological Federation
 Cave Exploration Group (South Australia) Incorporated
 Newcastle and Hunter Valley Speleological Society Inc. (NHVSS)
 The Victorian Speleological Association Inc.
 The Sydney Speleological Society
 Cave Diving Down Under (Cave Dive AUS)